Jamie Randolph Benn (born July 18, 1989) is a Canadian professional ice hockey winger and captain of the Dallas Stars of the National Hockey League (NHL).

In the 2007 NHL Entry Draft, Benn was drafted by the Dallas Stars 129th overall. He played his junior hockey career with the Kelowna Rockets of the Western Hockey League (WHL). He represented Canada at the 2009 World Junior Ice Hockey Championships, where he helped capture a gold medal. With Team Canada, he won a gold medal at the 2014 Winter Olympics in Sochi, Russia. In the 2014–15 NHL season, Benn was awarded the Art Ross Trophy as the league's leading scorer with 87 points. The Stars went to the Stanley Cup Final in 2020 under his leadership.

Playing career

Junior
Benn grew up playing hockey for the Peninsula Eagles minor hockey association and attended Stelly's Secondary School as a teenager. He played for the Peninsula Panthers of the Vancouver Island Junior Hockey League (VIJHL), a local Junior B team located in North Saanich, British Columbia, during the 2005–06 season. Following this, he played for the Victoria Grizzlies of the Junior A British Columbia Hockey League (BCHL) for parts of three seasons from 2006-2008.

Kelowna Rockets
Benn was drafted by the Dallas Stars 129th overall in the 2007 NHL Entry Draft from the Victoria Grizzlies. Following his draft, Benn began his major junior career with the Kelowna Rockets in the WHL. He scored 65 points in his rookie season in 2007–08, then improved to a team-high 46 goals along with 36 assists for 82 points in 56 games in the 2008–09 WHL season. After being named to the WHL West first All-Star team, Benn paced the Rockets with a playoff-leading 33 points en route to the 2009 Ed Chynoweth Cup title. In the subsequent 2009 Memorial Cup tournament, held in Rimouski, Quebec, Benn notched a four-goal game and added an assist in the second round-robin match against the Drummondville Voltigeurs, a 6–4 win, to secure the Rockets a berth in the tournament final. Although the Rockets lost to the Windsor Spitfires 4–1 in the Final, Benn was named to the Tournament All-Star team, along with teammate Tyler Myers.

Professional

Dallas Stars

Benn made the Dallas Stars' roster for the 2009–10 NHL season and scored his first NHL goal on October 11, 2009 against Roberto Luongo of the Vancouver Canucks. Benn tied the score 3–3 late in the game, but the Stars lost later in the shootout.

At the end of his rookie season, he was sent down to the Stars' AHL affiliate, the Texas Stars, for the 2010 Calder Cup playoffs. He scored 14 goals and had 26 points in 24 playoffs games as Texas fell to the Hershey Bears in the Calder Cup Finals. Benn later spoke of the experience, "I had a fun summer here...it was a big part of my hockey career and helped me develop my game. I definitely loved playing here."

Following teammate Brad Richards absence due to a concussion, Benn took a leading role with the Stars in February 2011. During the All Star Game's SuperSkills Competition, Benn participated in the Accuracy Shooting contest and won his leg against Steven Stamkos and Jonathan Drouin then the finals against Philadelphia Flyers rookie Matt Read with times of 13.583 and 10.204 seconds respectively.

With the 2012–13 NHL season delayed due to the labour lock-out, Benn signed a contract for the duration of the dispute with the Hamburg Freezers of the German DEL on October 2, 2012. Unable to initially agree to a contract with the Stars, Benn missed the first four games of the shortened NHL season before re-signing to a five-year, $26.25 million contract on January 24, 2013.

Benn was named the sixth captain of the Dallas Stars on September 19, 2013.

On April 11, 2015, Benn scored 4 points in the Stars' last regular-season game to finish with 87 points on the season and win the Art Ross Trophy. His final point, a secondary assist with 8.5 seconds left in the game, allowed him to overtake John Tavares for the award.

On July 15, 2016, Benn agreed to an eight-year, $76 million contract extension with Dallas that runs through the 2024–25 NHL season at an average annual value of $9.5 million.

On February 6, 2023, Benn played his 1,000th NHL game, and only the second player from the Stars organization to play them with the team after Mike Modano.

International play

Playing in his second WHL season, Benn was named to Team Canada, along with Kelowna Rockets teammate Tyler Myers, for the 2009 World Junior Ice Hockey Championships in Ottawa. He contributed 4 goals and 2 assists in 6 games, helping Canada to its record-tying fifth straight gold medal, defeating Sweden 5–1 in the final. Benn first represented the senior team at the 2012 IIHF World Championship.

On January 7, 2014, Benn was named to the Canadian Olympic hockey team for the 2014 Winter Olympics in Sochi despite not being invited to the orientation camp during the summer of 2013. In his first game as an Olympian, Benn scored the game-winning goal in Canada's first game against Norway in a 3–1 victory. He scored the only goal in a 1–0 win against the United States in the semi-final, to advance Canada to the gold medal game, where they eventually beat Sweden 3–0.

Personal life
Benn is the younger brother of defenceman Jordie Benn, who plays for the Toronto Maple Leafs, and formerly the brothers played alongside one another on the Dallas Stars.

Career statistics

Regular season and playoffs
Bold indicates led league

International

Awards and honors

References

External links

1989 births
Living people
Art Ross Trophy winners
Canadian expatriate ice hockey players in Germany
Canadian expatriate ice hockey players in the United States
Canadian ice hockey forwards
Dallas Stars draft picks
Dallas Stars players
Hamburg Freezers players
Ice hockey people from British Columbia
Ice hockey players at the 2014 Winter Olympics
Kelowna Rockets players
Medalists at the 2014 Winter Olympics
National Hockey League All-Stars
Olympic gold medalists for Canada
Olympic ice hockey players of Canada
Olympic medalists in ice hockey
Sportspeople from Dallas
Sportspeople from Victoria, British Columbia
Texas Stars players
Victoria Grizzlies players
Victoria Salsa players